Ivan Zhelizko (born 12 February 2001) is a Ukrainian professional footballer who plays as a midfielder for Latvian club Valmiera.

Honours
Valmiera
 Latvian Higher League: 2022

External links

References

2001 births
Living people
Sportspeople from Lviv
Ukrainian footballers
MFK Karviná players
Valmieras FK players
Ukrainian expatriate footballers
Expatriate footballers in the Czech Republic
Ukrainian expatriate sportspeople in the Czech Republic
Expatriate footballers in Latvia
Ukrainian expatriate sportspeople in Latvia
Czech First League players
Latvian Higher League players
Association football midfielders
Ukraine youth international footballers
Ukraine under-21 international footballers